The Athens State Hospital Cow Barn is a historic agricultural building on the grounds of the former state hospital in Athens, Ohio, United States.  One of several agricultural buildings associated with the hospital, it has been named a historic site.

The Athens State Hospital was founded in 1874, pursuant to legislation enacted seven years prior.  Within three years, the hospital was contracting with a local blacksmith to buy milk from his dairy, but by the early twentieth century, this arrangement had proven inconvenient, and in 1912 the hospital bought the farm associated with the dairy operation.  Two years later, the present cow barn was erected near the old farmhouse.  This was a time of expansion for the hospital complex, which retains numerous buildings from the beginning of the twentieth century; like much of the rest of the hospital, the cow barn displays Colonial Revival architectural influences, unlike the substantially older farmhouse next door.  The barn itself is a linear concrete building with some shingles on the walls, a concrete foundation, and a slate-covered gambrel roof.  Three towers are placed on the roofline, while dormer windows pierce the lower part of the roof at regular intervals.  A prominent entryway is set in the middle of the long side of the building, with six window-filled bays to each side.

In 1978, the old cow barn was listed on the National Register of Historic Places, qualifying both because of its place in local history and because of its historically significant architecture. No longer in agricultural use, the barn has been converted into an art gallery, the Dairy Barn Arts Center.

References

External links
Dairy Barn Arts Center

Buildings and structures completed in 1914
Art museums and galleries in Ohio
Barns on the National Register of Historic Places in Ohio
National Register of Historic Places in Athens County, Ohio
Colonial Revival architecture in Ohio
Dairy buildings in the United States
Tourist attractions in Athens County, Ohio
Barns in Ohio
Buildings and structures in Athens, Ohio